Long Low is a Neolithic and Bronze Age site in the English county of Staffordshire. It is about 2 km SE of Wetton.

It consists of two round cairns linked by a connecting bank – an unusual layout and one that is unique in England. It appears to be related to other chamber tombs of the Peak District group and was excavated by Samuel Carrington in 1849. Carrington found a burial chamber built from limestone orthostats with a paved floor. The bones of thirteen individuals were recovered as well as three leaf-shaped flint arrowheads.

It contained evidence of a cremation burial. It is now topped by a modern dry stone wall.

Because of the damage to the site, its rarity and the antiquity of the Carrington excavation it is unclear as to the precise nature of the monument. It is possible that the bank is a bank barrow which had a later Neolithic chambered cairn (the north cairn) built on one end and then a Bronze Age round barrow finally added at the southern end.

References

History of Staffordshire
Stone Age sites in England
Scheduled monuments in Staffordshire
Bronze Age sites in Staffordshire
Barrows in England